The Ford Shelby GR-1 is a high performance concept car developed and manufactured by Ford. It was first introduced to the public at the 2004 Pebble Beach Concours d'Elegance as a clay model. A fully functional concept was revealed at the 2005 North American International Auto Show. The GR-1 was inspired by and bears resemblance to the Shelby Daytona.

Much of the GR-1 chassis and running gear is based on the Ford Shelby Cobra Concept, a modern version of the 1960s original Shelby Cobra, which was presented one year earlier at the 2004 North American International Auto Show. As with the Ford Shelby Cobra Concept, the GR-1 project was led by Manfred Rumpel and developed by Ford's Advanced Product Creation group.

The GR-1 uses a 6.4L all-aluminum V10 engine and uses some components from the Ford GT. It uses a 6-speed manual transmission.

In early January 2019, Superformance announced they will be building a limited production line of the GR-1 concept, and will sport a 700bhp+ Supercharged V8 as Ford didn't make any V10's other than for their commercial truck fleet.

References

External links 
Autos y Diseño - Ford Shelby GR-1 concept
Ford Shelby GR1 Concept with Aluminum Body on Seriouswheels.com

Shelby GR-1
Cars introduced in 2005
Shelby vehicles